John Middleton, 1st Earl of Middleton (c. 1608–1674) was an English Army lieutenant general. General Middleton may also refer to:

Frederick Dobson Middleton (1825–1898), British Army general
John Middleton (British Army officer) (1678–1739), British Army brigadier general
Troy H. Middleton (1889–1976), U.S. Army lieutenant general